XLA may refer to:

 XLA (singer) (born 1981), Canadian indie singer
 .xla, a file format for Microsoft Excel add-ins
 X-linked agammaglobulinemia, an immune deficiency
 Xbox Live Avatar, a  character representing a user of the Xbox video game consoles
 Xin Los Angeles, a 2006 container ship registered in Hong Kong
 Dow XLA elastic fiber, a marketing name for Lastol
 X-stem Logic Alphabet
 XLA, the ICAO three letter callsign of former airline XL Airways UK